Piotr i Paweł is a retail chain of delicatessen and supermarket stores. The retail chain was founded in 1990 by Eleonora Woś and her two sons, Piotr and Paweł Woś.

As of October 24, 2016 the supermarket chain has 138 stores in Poland. Since 2003, the company additionally operates an online store, available across all of Poland.

History
In 1990, the brothers Piotr and Paweł Woś opened their first grocery store by Głogowska Street in Poznań. The name for the retail chain Piotr i Paweł reflects the first names of the two founders, as well as being the names of the two patron saints of Poznań: St. Peter and St. Paul. The second store of the Woś brothers was opened in Stare Zegrze, an eastern borough located in Poznań. The store had a floor size of 300 squared metres. The popularity of the store came about due to its supply of imported goods from Germany.

The late 1990s and the first decade of the twenty-first century saw the continued expansion of the delicatessen supermarkets. As of 2011, the company plans to expand its retail chain via 10 new stores annually. Between 2011 and 2016, 57 new stores were opened. In 2016, the company received the award of the Market of the Year for the "best quality of fresh produce". The company opened 11 stores across Poland in 2016. All shops are scheduled to rebrand as SPAR to end of 2020. The first store to change is in Blue City, Warsaw.

Structure
The Piotr i Paweł supermarket retail chain holds three logistics and distribution warehouses in:
 Koninko
 Gądki
 Stare Gnatowice

References

Food and drink companies of Poland
Retail companies established in 1990
Supermarkets of Poland
Polish brands
Polish companies established in 1990